was the 92nd emperor of Japan, according to the traditional order of succession.  His reign spanned the years from 1287 through 1298.

Name

Although the Roman-alphabet spelling of the name of this 13th-century emperor is the same as the personal name of the 20th century Emperor Shōwa, the kanji are different:
 Emperor Fushimi, formerly Prince Hirohito (熈仁)
 Emperor Shōwa, also known as Emperor Hirohito (裕仁)

Genealogy
He was the second son of Emperor Go-Fukakusa. They were from the Jimyōin-tō line.
Empress: Saionji (Fujiwara) Shoshi (西園寺（藤原）鏱子) later Eifukumon’In (永福門院), Saionji Sanekane‘s daughter

Consort: Tōin (Fujiwara) Sueko (洞院（藤原）季子) later Kenshinmon-in (顕親門院; 1265-1336), Tōin Saneo‘s daughter
First daughter: Imperial Princess Jushi (甝子内親王; 1287-1310）later Sakuheimon-in (朔平門院）
Third son: Imperial Prince Priest Kansho (寛性入道親王; 1289-1346）
Third daughter: Imperial Princess Enshi (延子内親王; b.1291）later Enmeimon-in (延明門院)
Fourth son: Imperial Prince Tomihito (富仁親王) later Emperor Hanazono

Lady-in-waiting: Itsutsuji (Fujiwara) Tsuneko (五辻（藤原）経子; d.1324), Itsutsuji Tsuneuji‘s daughter
First son: Imperial Prince Tanehito (胤仁親王) later Emperor Go-Fushimi

Court Lady: Toin (Fujiwara) Eiko (洞院（藤原）英子), Tōin Kinmune’s daughter
Second daughter: Imperial Princess Shigeko (誉子内親王) later Shogakumon’in (章義門院)

Court Lady: Ogimachi Moriko (正親町守子), Ogimachi Michiakira’s daughter
 Son: Imperial Prince Priest Kan’in (寛胤法親王)
 Son: Imperial Prince Priest Doki (道凞法親王)

Lady-in-waiting: Gondainagon-no-Tsubone (権大納言局), Nakanoin Tomouji’s daughter
 Sixth Son: Imperial Prince Priest Son’go (尊悟入道親王; 1299-1359）

Naishi: Miyoshi Hirako (三善衡子), Miyoshi Toshihira’s daughter
 Fifth son: Imperial Prince Priest Son'en (尊円法親王; 1298-1356）

 Fujiwara Shigemichi’s daughter
 Seventh Son: Imperial Prince Priest Sonki (尊凞法親王)

Court Lady: Kasuga-no-Tsubone (春日局)
 Second Son: Imperial Prince Priest E’jo (恵助法親王; 1289-1328）

Court Lady: Nishi-no-Kata (西御方)
 Eighth Son: Imperial Prince Priest Seijin (聖珍法親王)

His name comes from the palace of the Jimyōin-tō.

Biography
Hirohito-shinnō was named Crown Prince and heir to his first cousin, the Daikakuji-tō Emperor Go-Uda.  Political maneuvering by Fushimi's father, the Jimyōin-tō Emperor Go-Fukakusa, was a crucial factor in this choice.

In the year 1287 (Kōan 10, 10th month), in the 13th year of Go-Uda-tennōs reign (後宇多天皇十三年), the emperor abdicated; and the succession (senso) was received by his cousin.  Shortly thereafter, Emperor Fushimi is said to have acceded to the throne (sokui).

After this, there was a short period of time in which the two lines alternated power.  Two years later, the retired Emperor Go-Fukakusa ended his reign as Cloistered Emperor, and Fushimi took direct control.

In 1289, by making his own son (the future Emperor Go-Fushimi) Crown Prince, he increased the antagonism of the Daikakuji line.  In 1290, the family of Asawara Tameyori made an assassination attempt on the Emperor.

During his reign, efforts were made by the noble families to defeat the government, but the power of the Bakufu increased.  In 1298, Fushimi abdicated and began his reign as cloistered emperor. Three years later, in 1301, the Daikakuji Line rallied and forced Emperor Go-Fushimi to abdicate.

In 1308, his co-operation with the Bakufu succeeding, his fourth son's enthronement as Emperor Hanazono took place, and he again became cloistered Emperor.

During Fushimi's reign, the alternating plan for the Daikakuji and Jimyōin lines had not yet come into being, and the two lines fought each other for the throne.

 1313 (Shōwa 2, 10th month): Retired Emperor Fushimi shaved his head and became a Buddhist monk; and the power to administer the court of reigning Emperor Hanazono shifted to his adopted son, former-Emperor Go-Fushimi.

In 1317, former-Emperor Fushimi died; but his son, Emperor Hanazono, did not participate in formal mourning rites for him.  This was unprecedented; but this was rationalized with the explanation that Hanozono had become the adopted "son" of his older brother, former-Emperor Go-Fushimi.  Fushimi is enshrined with other emperors at the imperial tomb called Fukakusa no kita no misasagi (深草北陵) in Fushimi-ku, Kyoto.

Kugyō
 is a collective term for the very few most powerful men attached to the court of the Emperor of Japan in pre-Meiji eras. Even during those years in which the court's actual influence outside the palace walls was minimal, the hierarchic organization persisted.

In general, this elite group included only three to four men at a time.  These were hereditary courtiers whose experience and background would have brought them to the pinnacle of a life's career.  During Fushimi's reign, this apex of the Daijō-kan included: 
 Kampaku, Nijō Morotada, 1287–1289
 Kampaku, Konoe Iemoto, 1289–1291
 Kampaku, Kujō Tadanori, 1291–1293
 Kampaku, Konoe Iemoto, 1293–1296	
 Kampaku, Takatsukasa Kanetada, 1296–1298
 Sadaijin
 Udaijin
 Nadaijin
 Dainagon

Eras of Fushimi's reign
The years of Fushimi's reign are more specifically identified by more than one era name or nengō.
 Kōan (1278–1288)
 Shōō         (1288–1293)
 Einin             (1293–1299)

Ancestry

See also
 Fujiwara no Tamekane, Chūnagon
 Emperor of Japan
 List of Emperors of Japan
 Imperial cult

Notes

References
 Ponsonby-Fane, Richard Arthur Brabazon. (1959).  The Imperial House of Japan. Kyoto: Ponsonby Memorial Society. OCLC 194887
 Titsingh, Isaac. (1834). Nihon Ōdai Ichiran; ou,  Annales des empereurs du Japon.  Paris: Royal Asiatic Society, Oriental Translation Fund of Great Britain and Ireland. OCLC 5850691
 Varley, H. Paul. (1980).  Jinnō Shōtōki: A Chronicle of Gods and Sovereigns. New York: Columbia University Press. ; OCLC 5914584

Japanese emperors
1265 births
1317 deaths
Emperor Fushimi
Emperor Fushimi
Emperor Fushimi
13th-century Japanese monarchs
14th-century Japanese people
13th-century Japanese calligraphers
14th-century Japanese calligraphers
Japanese Buddhist monarchs
Japanese retired emperors
Kamakura period Buddhist clergy